Pseudopostega adusta is a moth of the family Opostegidae. It was described by Walsingham, Lord Thomas de Grey, in 1897. It is known from the West Indies, from Cuba east to Dominica, south to Belize and Ecuador. It is also known from Costa Rica.

The length of the forewings is 2.1–2.8 mm. Adults have been recorded in January, March to April and June.

References

Opostegidae
Moths of Central America
Moths of the Caribbean
Moths of South America
Moths of Cuba
Moths described in 1897